Cap FM; is a private generalist radio station in Tunisia.

Based in its Hammamet studios, it was founded by Olfa Tounsi on 24 March 2012. It broadcasts mainly in the regions of Nabeul and Grand Tunis. Its name refers to the name given in Tunisia to the region of Nabeul, Cape Bon.

References

Radio stations in Tunisia
Mass media in Tunis
2012 establishments in Tunisia
Radio stations established in 2012